Warren's Cave (or Warren Cave) is a dry karst cave in Alachua County, Florida. The cave is located on the margin of the Cody Scarp near the San Felasco Hammock Preserve State Park, northwest of the city of Gainesville. The property on which the entrance to Warren's Cave is located, the Warren Cave Nature Preserve, is owned by the National Speleological Society.

By local tradition, Warren's cave was discovered by and named after Colonel John Warren, who led government troops at the Battle of San Felasco Hammock during the Second Seminole War. The cave was a popular local attraction in the late 19th century, mentioned in tourist guides. Wooden stairs were built leading to the entrance of the cave in a sinkhole in an attempt to make it a commercial attraction. Since then, the discovery of several narrow passages ('squeezes') has greatly extended the known part of the cave.

References

External links
Newspaper reporter's account of trip into Warren's cave
Blog post on Warren's Cave, Agony Alley

Caves of Florida
Landforms of Alachua County, Florida